The Hotknives are an English ska band from Horsham in Sussex, England, formed in 1982.

Band history 
The original lineup of the Hotknives existed between 1982 and 1993. They created three albums, the live albums Live at the Boatman and Live & Skankin, and the studio album The Way Things Are. Their catalogue of songs include the live favourites "Holsten Boys", "Don't Go Away", "Skin Up Harry", "Dave and Mary", "Driving Me Mad", "Julie Julie", "W.L.N.", "Alcoholic Nightmare", "One Man And His Dog", "Believe It", and "Man In The Cellar".

The band featured the vocals and songwriting talents of Mick Clare and Gary Marshall. Clare played guitar and occasional harmonica. Marshall played rhythm guitar. Lead guitarist Dave Clifton also had a hand in writing some songs. Kev Clements, who started out as keyboard player, also wrote some songs, and finished up on the trumpet. Micky Matthews played saxophone and featured on "Turkey Stomp" and "Double Barrel". Mick Merritt and Clemmy played bass and drums respectively. Jim Mills took over keyboard duties from Clements. Paul Mumford and Colin Jones provided additional saxophone at times through the band's history.

The original lineup split up in 1993 and reformed a year later, slimmed down to become a four piece band. This consisted of original members Mick Clare and Clemmy with Bosky (Richard Allen) and Marc Carew. Bosky was formerly in Brighton based ska band Too Many Crooks, and Carew continues to play with the Long Tall Texans.

In 1996 the band released their second studio album, Home, on Grover Records and in 2000 followed up with the studio album Screams, Dreams and Custard Creams. In 2003 the lineup changed when Clare left and was replaced by Stuart Brown on guitar, with Carew taking over on lead vocals. In 2010 the band released their latest album, About Time.

In December 2014, a long lost recording emerged via the Facebook page "Fans of all line-ups of The Hotknives", Live & Erect, recorded live at Champagne's Nite Club in Horsham in August 1987. This featured 18 tracks, many of these which appeared on CD for the first time. These included "Dave's Song", "Recovery", "Knocking On Heaven's Door", and "Three Minute Warning".

Band members
The 1982 lineup:
 Gary Marshall
 Michael Clare
 Michael Matthews
 Michael Merritt
 Dave Clifton
 Kevin Clements
 Nigel Clements (Clemmy)

Members who joined later:
 Colin Jones
 Jim Mills
 Paul Mumford
 Will Kevans

Current members:
 Marc Carew - vocals, bass 
 Richard Allen - vocals, keyboards.
 Stuart Brown - guitar, backing vocals
 Clemmy - drums, backing vocals

Discography

Albums

References

External links
 The Hotknives on MySpace
  The Hotknives' Rateyourmusic.com profile
  Feature on The Hotknives from the Czech Republic 
 Feature on the Hotknives on German allska.de
  Feature on the Hotknives' performance at London International Ska Festival

Third-wave ska groups
English ska musical groups
Musical groups from West Sussex
Musical groups established in 1982
1982 establishments in England